John Higgins (7 January 1933 – 1994) was a Scottish footballer, who played for Celtic in the 1950s. He played for the Scottish Football League XI once.

After his playing career ended, Higgins worked as a coach at Celtic between 1961 and 1967. He became then the club's Chief Scout in 1967, and was involved in developing links between Celtic and the recently established Celtic Boys Club.

References 

Sources
 

1933 births
1994 deaths
People from Uddingston
Association football wingers
Scottish footballers
Celtic F.C. players
Celtic F.C. non-playing staff
Scottish Football League players
Footballers from South Lanarkshire
Date of death missing
Scottish Football League representative players
Association football coaches
Association football scouts